The 2018 Speedway of Nations was the first FIM Speedway of Nations. The competition consisted of two race-off events and a two-legged final. The event was won by Russia, who beat Great Britain in the Grand Final. It replaced the Speedway World Cup.

Format
The 2018 Speedway of Nations was a pairs event, with each nation being represented by two senior riders and one rider under the age of 21. Each meeting was staged over 21 heats with the scores from each rider added together to give a total for each nation.

The two race-off events consisted of seven teams, with three qualifying for the final. The final, which included hosts Poland, was staged over two legs with the scores from each added together. The top scoring nation went straight through to the Grand Final, while the second and third placed nations competed in the final qualifier for the chance to reach the Grand Final. 

The final qualifier and Grand Final were one-off heats. In the event of a tie, the second and third placed riders were considered the victors over the first and fourth placed riders.

The winner of the Grand Final determined the overall winner of the 2018 Speedway of Nations.

Race Off 1
  Teterow
 June 2

Race Off 2
  Manchester
 June 5

Final
  Wrocław, Olympic Stadium

First leg
 June 8

Second leg
 June 8

Total

Grand Final Qualifier

Grand Final

See also
 2018 Speedway Grand Prix
 motorcycle speedway
 2018 in sports

References

2018
Speedway of Nations
Speedway of Nations